Auto Antics is a 1939 Our Gang short comedy film directed by Edward Cahn.  It was the 182nd Our Gang short (183rd episode, 94th talking short, 95th talking episode, and 14th MGM produced episode) that was released.

Plot
Banners proclaim "Greenpoint's Proudest Day! - Mammoth Celebration Dedicating Our New Sewer System",
featuring the Kidmobile Race with a first prize of five dollars.
Our Gang's hopes to win the race are nearly dashed when town bully Butch (Tommy Bond) arranges for the gang's pet pooch Whiskers to be picked up by the dog pound. But instead of demoralizing the gang, the impoundment of Whiskers merely gives them a stronger reason to win the race and claim the prize, with which they will pay the dog's license fee. There is no shortage of dirty tricks on the part of Butch and his henchman Woim (Sidney Kibrick), who try everything to wreck the Gang's chances, and their homemade "auto."

Cast

The Gang
 Darla Hood as Darla
 Eugene Lee as Porky
 George McFarland as Spanky
 Carl Switzer as Alfalfa
 Billie Thomas as Buckwheat
 Mickey Gubitosi as Mickey
 Leonard Landy as Leonard

Additional cast
 Tommy Bond as Butch
 Sidney Kibrick as Woim
 Baldwin Cooke as Luke
 Major James H. McNamara as Mayor of Greenpoint
 Joe Whitehead as Dogcatcher

Notes
Auto Antics features the final appearance of Eugene "Porky" Lee, who was dismissed from the series after growing significantly taller (to the point that he became taller than George "Spanky" McFarland) during Our Gang's first year at MGM. Robert Blake, who had just replaced Gary Jasgar as the tag-along toddler, assumed the role vacated by Porky at the beginning of Our Gang's 1939–40 season of shorts.

Darla Hood became ill during the filming of Auto Antics. One shot features the kids hanging on to the back of the dogcatchers' truck as it starts down the road. Carl "Alfalfa" Switzer was, according to Hood in a later interview, "in one of his little moods" and ruined every take of that shot. At the end of the thirty-second take, Hood passed out from the exhaust fumes and had to be escorted to the hospital.

See also
Our Gang filmography

References

External links
 
 

1939 films
American black-and-white films
American auto racing films
Films directed by Edward L. Cahn
Metro-Goldwyn-Mayer short films
1939 comedy films
Our Gang films
1939 short films
1930s American films